Yassıbağ is a small village in Gülnar district of  Mersin Province, Turkey. At  it is situated to the southwest of Gülnar. The population of Yassıbağ was  only 77 as of 2012.

References

Villages in Gülnar District